Willem de Blécourt (full name: Wilhelmus Jacobus Christiaan de Blécourt) (born 29 December 1951) is a Dutch historical anthropologist specialising in the study of witchcraft and folk magic in Europe from the late Middle Ages to the 20th century. An Honorary Research Fellow at both the Huizinga Institute and the Meertens Institute, Amsterdam, de Blécourt is also a prolific author, having edited several books on the subject.

Bibliography

Monographs

Edited volumes

External links
Website Willem de Blécourt
Meertens Institute
Macmillan Publishers author entry

1951 births
Living people
20th-century Dutch historians
University of Amsterdam alumni
Erasmus University Rotterdam alumni
21st-century Dutch historians